Pecos may refer to:

Places
 Pecos River, rises near Santa Fe, New Mexico, United States
 Pecos, Texas, a city in Reeves County, Texas, United States
 Pecos County, Texas, named for the Pecos River
 Pecos Spring, a spring
 Pecos, New Mexico, a village, United States
 Pecos National Historical Park, a National Historical Park in the U.S. state of New Mexico
 Trans-Pecos, a region of Texas, United States

Ships
 USS Pecos, the name of two ships of the United States Navy
 USNS Pecos (T-AO-197), a U.S. Navy fleet replenishment oiler in service since 1989

Other uses
 Pecos Bill, a mythical American cowboy
 Pecos Classification, a division of all known Ancient Pueblo Peoples culture into chronological phases
 Pecos League, an independent professional baseball league headquartered in Houston
 Oryx/Pecos, a proprietary operating system developed by Bell Labs beginning in 1978, consisting of a kernel (Oryx) and the associated processes running on top of it (Pecos)

Pecos Smith
Character in:
 The Gun Packer, 1919 silent western
 hero of the Zane Grey novel West of the Pecos and its film adaptations:
 West of the Pecos, 1934 film
 West of the Pecos, 1945 film
 The Chinese Paymaster, 1967 novel

See also 
 Pecos Bill (disambiguation)
 Peco (disambiguation)